Anais Pouliot is a Canadian model. Born in Chicoutimi, Quebec, Pouliot now lives in New York City.

Career 
She has been featured on adverts for, among others, Louis Vuitton, Nina Ricci, Topshop, Sonia Rykiel, Aldo, H&M, Yves Saint Laurent, Anna Sui, Mugler, Mih jeans, Emporio Armani, Lancôme, Urban Outfitters, Tod's, Kate Spade, Nasty Gal and Barneys New York.

She has been on numerous magazine covers, including Vogue, Acne Paper, Elle, Fashion, Oyster, Vogue UK, L'Express, Le Monde, L'Officiel, Marie Claire and Air France Madame.

She often poses for Victoria's Secret website and catalogues.

She is said to be a friend of Miuccia Prada. To that, she answers "Let's say she recognizes me when she meets me on the street, and she smiles at me." She is also one of Terry Richardson's favorite models.

References

External links 

Canadian female models
People from Saguenay, Quebec
Living people
French Quebecers
Elite Model Management models
Year of birth missing (living people)